The Canadian Health Libraries Association or Association des bibliothèques de la santé du Canada was founded in 1976. It represents the views of Canadian health sciences librarians to governments, the health community and fellow librarians.

Chapters

CHLA/ABSC has twelve regional chapters:
Section Santé et services sociaux de la FMD (3S) (FMD3S)
Golden Horseshoe Health Libraries Association
Health Libraries Association of British Columbia
Manitoba Association of Health Information Providers
Maritimes Health Libraries Association / Association des bibliothèques de la santé des Maritimes
Newfoundland and Labrador Health Libraries Association
Northern Alberta Health Libraries Association
Ottawa Valley Health Libraries Association / Association des bibliothèques de la santé de la Vallée d'Outaouais
Saskatchewan Health Libraries Association
Southern Alberta Health Libraries Association
Toronto Health Libraries Association
Wellington-Waterloo-Dufferin Health Library Network

Conference
CHLA/ABSC holds an annual, peer-reviewed conference which rotates among regions in Canada.

Publications
eNews (2015-present)
Journal of the Canadian Health Libraries Association (2004present)
Bibliotheca Medica Canadiana (19792003)
CHLA/ABSC Newsletter (19771979) Nos. 1-8.

References

External links 
Canadian Health Libraries Association - CHLA/ABSC 
CHLA / ABSC Canadian Health Libraries Association / Association des bibliothèques de la santé du Canada Fonds Osler Library of the History of Medicine
Article by David S. Crawford (CHLA's first President), reprinted from the Association's journal, Bibliotheca Medica Canadiana,  describing the formation of the Association.

Professional associations based in Canada
Canadian library associations
Medical associations based in Canada